Interstate 280 (I-280) is a  major north–south auxiliary Interstate Highway in the San Francisco Bay Area of Northern California. It runs from I-680 and US Route 101 (US 101) in San Jose to King and 5th streets in San Francisco, running just to the west of the larger cities of San Francisco Peninsula for most of its route.

From I-880 in San Jose to State Route 1 (SR 1) in Daly City, I-280 was built and dedicated as the Junipero Serra Freeway, after the Spanish Franciscan friar who founded the first nine of 21 Spanish missions in California from San Diego to San Francisco. One of the dedication signs (in Daly City) still indicates that the Junipero Serra Freeway is known as the "World's Most Beautiful Freeway" due to its scenic route through the San Francisco Peninsula. From SR 1 to the James Lick Freeway (US 101) in San Francisco it is officially called the John F. Foran Freeway (after a former member of the California State Legislature). From the James Lick Freeway to its northern end at King and 5th streets, I-280 is called the Southern-Embarcadero Freeway.

I-280 is one of two auxiliary Interstate designations to appear on opposite coasts of the United States.  I-110 in California and Florida is the only other designation.

I-280 was formerly shown on the app icon for Apple's iOS and macOS built-in Apple Maps. This is because the highway goes through Cupertino, the home of Apple's headquarters.

Route description 

The southern end of I-280 is at the Joe Colla Interchange with US 101 in San Jose, where it acts as a continuation of I-680 westward. In between San Jose and San Francisco, I-280 passes through Santa Clara, Cupertino, Los Altos, and Los Altos Hills before it settles along its scenic route just to the west of the cities of the San Francisco Peninsula in San Mateo County and just to the east of the Santa Cruz Mountains. I-280 reemerges in a decidedly urbanized area in the city of San Bruno, passing through South San Francisco and Daly City before it runs across a southeastern swath of the city of San Francisco on the way to its northern terminus.

The segment of the Junipero Serra Freeway between Cupertino (SR 85) and Daly City (SR 1) has been called the "World's Most Beautiful Freeway" since its dedication in the 1960s. Drivers along this portion of I-280 are treated to scenic views of the Santa Cruz Mountains to the west and, at a few points, San Francisco Bay to the east and are isolated by hills from the cities to the east. Through much of this segment, the freeway is actually running just inside the eastern rim of the rift valley of the San Andreas Fault.

For nearly all of its length, I-280 runs roughly parallel and several miles to the west of US 101 (Bayshore Freeway). Both freeways are north–south routes connecting San Jose with San Francisco; however, unlike I-280, the route that US 101 takes between the two cities goes entirely through urbanized areas. The vast majority of the population of the San Francisco Peninsula lives somewhere between I-280 and US 101.

I-280 does not currently intersect with I-80, its parent Interstate, although it was originally intended to do so. Although San Francisco planned and has had several opportunities to connect I-280 to I-80, it has chosen to use the money for other purposes. Instead, I-280's northernmost extension, which includes a significant double-deck section (with northbound traffic on the lower deck and southbound traffic on the upper), primarily functions now as a spur into the Financial District, San Francisco, as suggested by signage on northbound US 101 at the Alemany Maze.

Major intersections include US 101 and SR 1 in San Francisco, I-380 in San Bruno, SR 92 in San Mateo, SR 85 in Cupertino, and I-880 and I-680 and US 101 in San Jose.

I-280 is part of the California Freeway and Expressway System and is part of the National Highway System, a network of highways that are considered essential to the country's economy, defense, and mobility by the Federal Highway Administration (FHWA). I-280 is eligible for the State Scenic Highway System and, from the San Mateo–Santa Clara county line to the San Bruno city limits, is officially designated as a scenic highway by the California Department of Transportation (Caltrans), meaning that it is a substantial section of highway passing through a "memorable landscape" with no "visual intrusions", where the potential designation has gained popular favor with the community. The Junipero Serra Freeway is the name of I-280 from SR 1 in San Francisco to SR 17, as named by Assembly Concurrent Resolution 140, Chapter 208 in 1967, in honor of Spanish missionary Junípero Serra, who founded many of California's missions in the 18th century. I-280 from its southern terminus at US 101 and I-680 north to I-880 in San Jose is part of the Sinclair Freeway (named after Joseph P. Sinclair, District Engineer for District 4 California Division of Highways).

History

I-280 was added to the Interstate Highway System on September 15, 1955 as a route from San Jose north to San Francisco. This ran along the present alignment of I-280 south of San Francisco, but, in San Francisco, it was instead intended to run north parallel to SR 1, past the planned west end of I-80 which would have been at the junction with the Panhandle Freeway just south of Fulton and Park Presidio, along what would have been the Park Presidio Freeway north to the south approach to the Golden Gate Bridge. At that point, I-280 would have met I-480 (Embarcadero Freeway), which would have headed east on Doyle Drive (US 101), the Golden Gate Freeway, and onto the Embarcadero Freeway to reach the San Francisco–Oakland Bay Bridge. I-480 would have continued south on the never-built section of the Southern-Embarcadero Freeway from Folsom and the Embarcadero to 5th and King streets, then along the present Southern-Embarcadero Freeway to meet the Southern Freeway (now I-280) near the Alemany Maze, which served as the US 101 Bypass until I-280 was built. The I-280 number was approved on November 10, 1958.

In the 1964 renumbering, I-280's legislative designation was officially applied to your the planned route. This replaced SR 1 in San Francisco; the new SR 1 alignment turned northeast where I-280 now runs, quickly ending at SR 82 (San Jose Avenue/Alemany Boulevard). SR 1, however, continued to be signed along its former (and current) alignment, which had not been upgraded to freeway standards.

A realignment approved January 1968 primarily took I-280's legislative definition onto its current route. This new routing ran along what had been SR 1, SR 82, SR 87, and I-480 (downgraded to SR 480 then), ending at I-80 at the western Bay Bridge approach. This change was made on the state level in 1968, restoring SR 1 to its current alignment and truncating SR 82, SR 87 and SR 480.

For the scenic portion, the section of I-280 between SR 85 (Cupertino) and SR 84 (Woodside) was completed in the late 1960s alongside SR 85. The section between SR 92 (San Mateo) and SR 84 was not completed until the 1970s. Until then, traffic was routed on Cañada Road between the two ends.

A direct freeway connection between I-280 and I-80 was never completed. I-280 was planned to run along The Embarcadero underneath the Bay Bridge approach/I-80 to connect to SR 480 and then loop back to the Bay Bridge approach/I-80 near 1st Street. However, the segment of I-280 between 3rd Street and SR 480 was never built. This left I-280 terminating in midair at 3rd Street, along with ramp stubs at 5th Street that were intended to connect to the second proposed location of a parallel bay bridge (which was also never built). This also caused the completed freeway segment from the Bay Bridge approach/I-80 near 1st Street to The Embarcadero to be signed as part of SR 480 instead of I-280. After the 1989 Loma Prieta earthquake, plans to connect I-280 to I-80 were formally abandoned, the earthquake-damaged Embarcadero Freeway was torn down in 1991, and the northern terminus of I-280 was reconfigured to the present-day King Street on/offramps in 1997.

The interchange at the beginning of I-280 at I-680 and US 101 in San Jose was constructed years before its completion. The three flyovers, with no connecting ramps, stood as a  monument to inefficiency for years in the 1970s, becoming the butt of local jokes. The highlight prank occurred in January 1976, when a 1960 Chevrolet Impala was placed on the highest bridge overnight, where it obviously would be impossible to drive. The following day, San Jose City Councilmember Joe Colla was photographed standing next to the car, an image that was circulated across many newspapers.  It has been suggested this stunt nudged the state of California to find the funds to complete the freeway. The ramps opened five years later in 1981. In 2010, a resolution was introduced in the state legislature to name it the Joe Colla Interchange in memory of the late councilmember.

In 2021, University of California, Davis researchers published a report on wildlife-vehicle collisions based on California Highway Patrol and insurance data over the past five years, according to which five of the 20  stretches of highway in the state with the highest costs for this reason are on I-280, the worst being between San Bruno and Cupertino.

Exit list

See also

References

External links

AARoads – Interstate 280
Planning maps for the pre-1968 planned route of the freeway along Junipero Serra Boulevard in San Francisco
Caltrans: Route 280 highway conditions
California Highways: I-280
Freeways not built in S.F.

80-2
280
80-2 California
2 California
Interstate 80-2
Interstate 80-2
Interstate 80-2
280
Transportation in Sunnyvale, California
Junípero Serra